Giovanni Veronesi (born 1962) is an Italian film  screenwriter, actor and director. Born in Prato, he is the brother of the writer Sandro Veronesi.

He started his career writing scripts for directors such as Francesco Nuti, Leonardo Pieraccioni, Massimo Ceccherini and Carlo Verdone. He debuted as film director with Maramao in 1987, before reaching commercial success with What Will Happen to Us (2004). He is known for his Manual of Love romantic comedy trilogy: Manual of Love (2005), Manual of Love 2 (2007) and The Ages of Love (2011).

His partner is actress Valeria Solarino, whom Veronesi directed in What Will Happen to Us.

Filmography

Film director
Maramao (1987)
For Love, Only for Love (1993)
Silenzio... si nasce (1996)
The Barber of Rio (1996)
Viola Kisses Everybody (1998)
Gunslinger's Revenge (1998)
Witches to the North (2001)
What Will Happen to Us (2004)
Manual of Love (2005)
Manual of Love 2 (2007)
Italians (2009)
Parents and Children: Shake Well Before Using (2010)
The Ages of Love (2011)
The Fifth Wheel (2013)
A Woman as a Friend (2014)
No Country for Young Men (2017)
The King's Musketeers (2018)
Tutti per 1 - 1 per tutti (2020)

Screenwriter
All the Fault of Paradise (1985)
Stregati (1987)
Maramao (1987)
Caruso Pascoski, Son of a Pole (1988)
Women in Skirts (1991)
Vacanze di Natale '91 (1991)
Anni 90 (1992)
Amami (1992)
For Love, Only for Love (1993)
OcchioPinocchio (1994)
Men Men Men (1995)
The Graduates (1995)
Silenzio... si nasce (1996)
3 (1996)
The Barber of Rio (1996)
The Cyclone (1996)
Cinque giorni di tempesta (1997)
Fireworks (1997)
Viola Kisses Everybody (1998)
Gunslinger's Revenge (1998)
Lucignolo (1999)
The Fish in Love (1999)
A Chinese in a Coma (2000)
Picasso's Face (2000)
Witches to the North (2001)
The Prince and the Pirate (2001)
My Life with Stars and Stripes (2003)
Suddenly Paradise (2003)
What Will Happen to Us (2004)
Manual of Love (2005)
I Love You in Every Language in the World (2005)
Manual of Love 2 (2007)
Il professor Cenerentolo (2015)
The King's Musketeers (2018)
Tutti per 1 - 1 per tutti (2020)
Si vive una volta sola (2021)

Actor
A School Outing (1983)
Caruso Pascoski, Son of a Pole (1988)
Picasso's Face (2000)
Fughe da fermo (2001)

External links

 

1962 births
Living people
People from Prato
Italian film directors
Italian screenwriters
Italian male screenwriters
David di Donatello winners